An OCL amplifier (output capacitor-less amplifier) is any audio amplifier with direct-coupled capacitorless output. Typically, OCL amplifiers can be any of several amplifier classes, and typically have a push-pull output stage.

Advantages of OCL amplifiers over capacitor-coupled amplifiers include
 Avoiding the cost and bulk of an output capacitor
 better immunity to motorboat oscillation
 larger output power at very low frequencies and DC

Disadvantages of OCL amplifiers include
 larger power dissipation and passing DC through the load, in the minority of designs with poorly controlled DC bias point
 increased sensitivity of the output DC bias point to process variations, although the last disadvantage is less important for older bipolar processes.

Implementations 

 LM4910 by National Semiconductor
 Lab tutorial on OCL amplifier from Hong Kong Polytechnic University

Audio amplifiers

References 

pl:Wzmacniacz (muzyka)